Kenny Wilhite (born July 26, 1970) is a former Canadian football defensive back in the Canadian Football League who played for the Sacramento Gold Miners, San Antonio Texans, Ottawa Rough Riders, and Hamilton Tiger-Cats. He played college football for the Nebraska Cornhuskers.

He is currently on the coaching staff of the Nebraska Cornhuskers.

References

1970 births
Living people
American football defensive backs
Canadian football defensive backs
Sacramento Gold Miners players
San Antonio Texans players
Ottawa Rough Riders players
Hamilton Tiger-Cats players
Nebraska Cornhuskers football players